The Eemian Sea was a body of water located approximately where the Baltic Sea is now during the last interglacial, or Eemian Stage, Marine isotopic stage (MIS) 5e, roughly 130,000 to 115,000 years BP. Sea level was 5 to 7 metres higher globally than it is today, due to the release of glacial water in the early stage of the interglacial. Although “Eemian” rightly applies only to the northern European glacial system, some scientists use the term in a wider sense to mean any high-level body of water in the last interglacial.

The early Eemian Sea connected with the White Sea along the line of the present White Sea-Baltic Canal. Karelia was inundated and Lakes Ladoga and Onega were mere depressions in the shallow eastern end of the Eemian sea. At the other end the sea connected to the North Sea more broadly than it presently does. Much of northern Europe was under shallow water. Scandinavia was an island. The salinity of the Eemian Sea was comparable to that of the Atlantic. Scientists reach these conclusions from a study of types of micro-organisms fossilized in the clay sediments laid down in the Eemian Sea, and from the included pollen of Corylus, Carpinus and Betula.

During MIS 5e, the mean annual temperature was 3°C higher than today. At its end, during the cooler prelude of MIS 5d, c, b and a, the region continued to rise isostatically. Some water was recaptured in ice. Levels in the Eemian Sea dropped, and the opening to the White Sea was blocked. The post-Eemian brackish lake did not last long geologically speaking, but was covered totally with ice. As the lake bed was only a few hundred metres deep, no lake could  have existed. The ice extended southward into northern Europe as far as France and eastward as far as Poland. At its recession, the Baltic Ice Lake appeared.

See also
 Baltic Ice Lake, 12,600–10,300 (years before present)
 Yoldia Sea, 10,300–9500
 Ancylus Lake, 9,500–8,000
 Mastogloia Sea, 8,000–7,500
 Littorina Sea, 7,500–4,000
 Post-Littorina Baltic Sea, 4,000–present

References

External links
Background to the BALTEEM Project
Eemian at Peski

European seas
History of the Baltic Sea
Bodies of water of the White Sea